Nigel Xavier (born November 29, 1998) is an Atlanta-based fashion designer known for his patchwork and textile manipulation. In 2023, he was named the Next in Fashion Season 2 winner and is called the "wizard of denim."

Early life and education 
Xavier was born on November 29, 1998 in Trinidad and Tobago, Venezuela, from parents Marshal and Stella Xavier.  

In 2010, he moved to Atlanta, Georgia, and spent a lot of time in Summerhill. Xavier was a former high school football player but chose to go down the fashion route.

Career 
Xavier works as a fashion designer in Georgia. He is inspired by fabrics, materials, culture, and nostalgia. He specializes in denim clothing, drawing heavily from the 90s and early 2000s fashion.

Before joining Next in Fashion Season 2, Xavier has already created designs for celebrities, including Playboi Carti and A$AP Rocky, among several others. He also had the opportunity to style the famous rapper 2 Chainz.

Next in Fashion 
Xavier joined the Next in Fashion Season 2, which was aired all episodes on March 3, 2023. He made it to the Finale, where he competed against his fellow designer contestants Bao Tranchi and Deontre Hancock. After showcasing his 8 stunning outfits collection in the finale, inspired by Woodstock, Xavier was named the Next in Fashion Season 2 and won the grand cash prize of $200,000. 

The judges and hosts, Gigi Hadid, Jason Bolden, and Tan France, were impressed with his fun collection, while representing his brand and creating a cohesive collection to showcase on the runway in three days. Aside from the prize money, Xavier also got a deal with Rent The Runway.

References 

 Fashion
 Living people
 1998 births